Nils Janson (May 10, 1978) is a Swedish jazz trumpeter. His albums include Debut, Excavation, and Alloy. He is also active in pop, rock and Latin music, playing horns with Mando Diao, Calle Real, Hello Saferide, and Vincent Pontare.

External links
  My Space Homepage
  Found You Recordings

References

1978 births
Living people
Swedish jazz composers
Male jazz composers
Swedish jazz trumpeters
Male trumpeters
21st-century trumpeters
21st-century Swedish male musicians